Carl Thomas may refer to:

Carl Thomas (baseball) (1932–2013), American Major League Baseball pitcher
Carl Thomas (basketball) (born 1969), American basketball player
Carl Thomas (singer) (born 1972), American R&B singer
Tre Thomas (Carl Grady Thomas III, born 1975), American football player 
Carl Thomas, member of dance music group K-Klass
Carl Thomas, fictional character in On Beauty

See also

Karl Thomas (disambiguation)